The Corpus Inscriptionum Etruscarum (Body of Etruscan inscriptions) is a corpus of Etruscan texts, collected by Carl Pauli and his followers since 1885. After the death of Olof August Danielsson in 1933, this collection was passed on to the Uppsala University Library.

The CIE serves as a valuable reference index for many Etruscan texts, using a simple number system. For example, CIE 6 refers to the inscription mi avileś apianaś (I [am] of Avile Apiana.). There are other indices in existence as well.

Numbers
 1907. O. A. Danielsson. Corpus inscriptionum Etruscarum/ Vol. 2, Sect. 1, Fasc. 1, (Tit. 4918 - 5210). Lipsiae: Barth.
 1964. Corpus inscriptionum Etruscarum 2. Sectio I: Fasc. 1 (Tit. 4918-5210) ; Sect. I: Fasc. 2 (Tit. 5211-5326) ; Sect. II. Fasc.1 (Tit. 8001-8600); Libri lintei Etrusci fragmenta Zagrabiensia. Rome: "L'Erma" di Bretschneider.
 1923. O. A. Danielsson. Corpus inscriptionum Etruscarum/ Vol. 2, Sect. 1, Fasc. 2, (Tit. 5211 - 5326). Lipsiae : Barth. 
 1936. O. A. Danielsson ed. E. Sittig. Corpus inscriptionum Etruscarum/ Vol. 2, Sect. 1, Fasc. 3, (Tit. 5327 - 5606). Lipsiae : Barth.
 1970. Mauro Cristofani. Corpus inscriptionum Etruscarum/ Vol. 2, Sect. 1, Fasc. 4,2, (Tit. 5607 - 6324) : 2, Tabulae et indices. Lipsiae: Barth.
 1996. Maristella Pandolfini Angeletti. Corpus Inscriptionum Etruscarum / Voluminis Secundi / [Sect II], Fasciculum 2, Tit. 8601-8880, Inscriptiones et in Latio et in Campania repertae. Romae : Istituto per l'archeologia etrusco-italica del Consiglio nazionale delle ricerche.
 Carl Eugen Pauli and Maristella Pandolfini Angeletti. Corpus inscriptionum Etruscarum/ Vol. 3, Fasc. 1, (Tit. 10001 - 10520): Inscriptiones in instrumento et Tarquiniis et in Agro Tarquiniensi repertae vol. 3, fasc. 1. Romae : 
 1987. Iuliana Magini Carella Prada et Maristella Pandolfini Angeletti. Corpus inscriptionum Etruscarum/ Vol., 3, Fasc. 2, (Tit. 10521 - 10950): Inscriptiones in instrumento et Volsiniis et in Agro Volsiniensi repertae. Lipsiae: Barth.
 2004. Adriano Maggiani. Corpus inscriptionum Etruscarum/ Vol. 3, Fasc. 4, (Tit. 11539 - 12113): Inscriptiones in instrumento et Rusellis et Vetuloniae et in earum agris repertae. Lipsiae : Barth.
 2006. Giovanni Colonna, Daniele F. Maras, Corpus Inscriptionum Etruscarum, Academiis Litterarum Borussica et Saxonica legatum, Carolus Pauli primum edidit. Voluminis secundi, Instituti Studiis Etruscis et Italicis Provehendis et Academiae Scientiarum Berolinensis et Brandenburgensis communi opera et studio resumpti prolatique, Instituto Studiis de Gentibus Italiae Marisque Mediterranei Antiqui Provehendis Italicis Scientiis Pervestigandis Consilii curante. Sectionis I, Fasciculum 5 (Tit. 6325-6723) et additamentum Sectionis II, Fasciculi 1 (Tit. 8881-8927). Inscriptiones Veiis et in agro veientano, nepesino sutrinoque repertae, additis illis in agro capenate et falisco inventis, quae in fasciculo CIE II, 2, 1 desunt, nec non illis perpaucis in finitimis sabinis repertis. Pisa-Rome:  Istituti Editoriali e Poligrafici Internazionali.  Pp. viii, 140; figs. 37, b/w pls.  . Review by J. M. Turfa. Bryn Mawr Classical Review 2007.07.04

See also
 Corpus Speculorum Etruscorum
 Thesaurus Linguae Etruscae
 Etruscan language
 Epigraphy

References
 Pauli C. et al., Corpus Inscriptionum Etruscarum, (Lipsia 1919–21)

External links
 Etruscan Texts Project A searchable collection of Etruscan inscriptions intended to collect all "Etruscan inscriptions that have been recovered and made public since 1990".

1885 in science
Archaeological corpora
Etruscan inscriptions
Etruscan language
Epigraphy